Come Back, Charleston Blue is a 1972 American comedy film starring Godfrey Cambridge and Raymond St. Jacques, loosely based on Chester Himes' novel The Heat's On.  It is a sequel to the 1970 film Cotton Comes to Harlem.

Plot
Detectives Ed "Coffin Ed" Johnson and "Grave Digger" Jones are confounded by a string of strange murders in the neighborhood of Harlem, New York.  The murders themselves are not nearly as bizarre as the calling card left by the murderer:  a blue steel straight razor.  Legend has it that this was the calling card of Charleston Blue, a vigilante who tried to rid the neighborhood of all criminal elements using a straight razor. Blue, having disappeared years ago after he went after Dutch Schultz (with his trusty straight razor) was considered dead by all except his girlfriend, who kept his razors locked away until his "come back."

Soon after the murders start it is discovered that the razors were missing and all evidence points to Joe Painter, a local photographer, who has begun dating Carol, the beloved niece of mafia errand boy Caspar Brown.  Joe and Brown are at odds over Caspar's refusal to help Joe kick the mafia out of the neighborhood, so Joe enlists the help of a group of brothers and the spirit of Charleston Blue. However, Coffin Ed Johnson and Grave Digger Jones discover that Joe's plan does not seem to be exactly what he claimed it was.

Cast
 Godfrey Cambridge as Detective "Gravedigger" Jones
 Raymond St. Jacques as Detective Ed "Coffin Ed" Johnson
 Peter Deanda as Joe Painter
 Percy Rodriguez as Bryce
 Jonelle Allen as Carol
 Maxwell Glanville as Caspar
 Minnie Gentry as Her Majesty
 Dick Sabol as Jarema
 Leonardo Cimino as Frank Mago
 Toney Brealond as Drag Queen
 Tim Pelt as Earl J
 Marcia McBroom as Girl Barber
 Darryl Knibb as Douglas
 Joseph Ray as Bubba
 Adam Wade as Benjy
 Dorothi Fox as Streetwalker

Also appearing in a minor role is Philip Michael Thomas (as a Minister) in his film debut.

Production
The film was shot in Harlem, which required producer Samuel Goldwyn Jr. to negotiate with CORE and other groups over their demands for "money, jobs and control."

Reception
This film was a sequel to the film Cotton Comes to Harlem: appearing two years later, it opened to mixed reviews, with critics feeling it was decent, but not riotous like the original 1970 film.

In April 1972, less than three months before the film's release, Time magazine called the film "part of a new Hollywood wave of eminently commercial movies by blacks about the black experience," a wave that included Sweet Sweetback's Baadasssss Song, Shaft, Shaft's Big Score, Cool Breeze, Buck and the Preacher, The Legend of Nigger Charley, Super Fly, and Blacula.

A.H. Weiler, reviewing the film for The New York Times, called it "only occasionally funny or incisive" with a "convoluted plot and dialogue that is often too 'in' for the uninitiated."

Soundtrack
All tracks written by Donny Hathaway except "Little Ghetto Boy" (Earl DuRouen / Edward Howard) and "Come Back Charleston Blue" (Donny Hathaway / Al Cleveland / Quincy Jones).

In November 2007, Rhino Records released a remastered version of the soundtrack album, which included two new tracks, an alternate version and a live version of "Little Ghetto Boy."

See also
 List of American films of 1972

References

External links
 
 
 

1972 films
1970s crime comedy films
African-American films
American sequel films
Films based on American novels
Films based on crime novels
Films set in Harlem
Films shot in New York City 
Warner Bros. films
American comedy mystery films
American police detective films
1972 comedy films
1970s comedy mystery films
1970s English-language films
1970s American films